Pacific Sun may refer to:

 Pacific Sun (airline), a regional airline based in Fiji
 Pacific Sun (newspaper), a weekly newspaper in California
 Pacific Sun (ship), former name of a holiday class cruise ship now renamed Henna 
 Pacific Sun (song), a single by Force & Styles